The Institute of Management Technology Dubai (IMT Dubai) is an international business school. It is certified by the Ministry of Higher Education, UAE; the Institute is licensed by MOHESR and KHDA, and all its programs are accredited by the CAA.

It offers accredited undergraduate and postgraduate programs to students from a multitude of nationalities and educational backgrounds. Established in 2006, the Institute was among the first International Business Schools to have set up a full-fledged campus in Dubai.

At the undergraduate level IMT Dubai offers a Bachelor of Science in Business Administration (full-time). At the graduate level it offers a full-time MBA for fresh graduates and an Executive MBA (on weekends) for working professionals. Students from various nationalities including the Middle East, India, Southeast Asia, and Europe study together.

The Dubai campus is the third campus of IMT.

Memberships 
IMT Dubai is a member of various international organizations such as:
 Brussels based European Foundation for Management Development (EFMD), which is the umbrella organization for leading European business schools in charge of EQUIS accreditation
 The Association to Advance Collegiate Schools of Business (AACSB International), the most reputed international body which accredits schools of business. It is regarded as the benchmark for business school quality among the academic community.
 Supply Chain & Logistics Group SCLG 
 Dubai Quality Group 
 International Chamber of Commerce

References

Universities and colleges in Dubai
Business schools in the United Arab Emirates